That's Where It's At is a 1962 jazz album by saxophonist Stanley Turrentine, recorded by Rudy Van Gelder for Blue Note Records, and featuring pianist Les McCann. Turrentine had appeared a week earlier with McCann's group, recording the live date that would be released as Les McCann Ltd. in New York.

Track listing
 "Smile, Stacey" (Les McCann) – 8:09
 "Soft Pedal Blues" (Stanley Turrentine) – 7:29
 "Pia" (McCann) – 5:38
 "We'll See Yaw'll After While, Ya Heah" (McCann) – 7:24
 "Dorene Don't Cry, I" (McCann) – 6:16
 "Light Blue" (Tommy Turrentine) – 6:32
 "Light Blue" [Alternate Take] – 6:26

Personnel
 Stanley Turrentine – tenor saxophone
 Les McCann – piano
 Herbie Lewis – bass
 Otis Finch – drums

Design Personnel
 Reid Miles - Cover Design
 Francis Wolff - Cover Photo

References

1962 albums
Albums produced by Alfred Lion
Blue Note Records albums
Stanley Turrentine albums
Hard bop albums
Soul jazz albums
Albums recorded at Van Gelder Studio